Not Forgotten is a 2009 American independent horror thriller written and directed by Dror Soref starring Simon Baker and Paz Vega. The film takes place on the Texas-Mexico border and tells the story of a kidnapping plot involving the ritualistic cult Santa Muerte. The protagonist Jack Bishop's (Simon Baker) dark past is slowly uncovered as the kidnapping case unravels.

Plot
Jack Bishop (Simon Baker) works as a loan officer in Del Rio, Texas, and is remarried to Amaya Bishop (Paz Vega), living with her and his daughter Toby Bishop (Chloë Grace Moretz) from his first marriage. Toby is kidnapped by an unknown perpetrator leading to the involvement of the local police and eventually the FBI. The FBI begins inquiring in Jack's past only to find out he has no official records dating back farther than ten years, and there is no evidence showing how his first wife had died or where she was buried.

A local petty criminal and repeated sex offender is initially thought to be the culprit, but it is revealed that the dangerous cult-like religious movement Santa Muerte, popular within Mexican criminal circles, might be involved. Jack's former life as a Santa Muerte worshiping hit man for the Mexican Mafia is revealed as he tries desperately to find out who kidnapped his daughter.  We later learn that Jack was really named Roberto.  Though born in Oklahoma, his drug addicted mother took him to Mexico when she was young.  She later died, and Roberto had to make a life for himself on the streets.  He ultimately became an enforcer for the Mexican Mafia.  He married a woman named Katie, and they had a child, Toby.  Jack escapes from the FBI in Texas and makes his way across the border to Acuna.  There he is accused of murdering a prostitute who was trying to help him find Toby.  Though he did not do it, the Mexican police arrest him.  Jack is later able to escape from the Mexican jail in disguise.  Still in Acuna, he makes his presence known.  As he planned, he lured the assassin who was looking for him to come to his hotel.  They fight and Jack beats the assassin, who he then tortures for information about Toby's whereabouts.  The assassin tells Jack that Toby was kidnapped by Katie, Jack's/Roberto's ex-wife.  Jack breaks into the brothel that Katie now runs in Acuna and confronts Katie, who is herself furious that Jack/Roberto ran out on her without warning and took Toby with him.  Jack thinks Katie is lying when she says she does not know where Toby is, and murders her.

In the film's denouement, we realize that the real kidnapper was Jack's new wife, Amaya, with the help of her cousin, the sheriff in Del Rio (who throughout the film appeared as if he was trying to help Jack and that he believed Jack's innocence).  We learn that the flashback we have seen throughout the film—of Jack/Roberto strangling a man at Katie's behest as she looks on in delight—has new meaning.  The man Roberto strangled was Amaya's father.  Worse still, Amaya was in the room with Roberto and Katie when they strangled her father, hiding under the bed.  Amaya's father was a degenerate gambler who owed a large debt to Katie and the Mexican Mob, and when he could not pay, Katie had Roberto kill him.  Amaya witnessed all of this.  We realize that she then set in motion an elaborate plan to emigrate to the United States and marry Jack/Roberto in order to punish him for murdering her father.  It was Amaya and the sheriff who kidnapped Toby.  Amaya and the sheriff set fire to the room where Jack is (the same room where he killed Amaya's father many years ago).  But Jack is able to see that Toby is tied up on the bed in the room.  He manages to free her and they escape the fire unhurt.

The viewer thinks this is the end of the movie and that it has a happy ending.  But we then learn, in a final twist, the truth.  Amaya did not really kidnap Toby.  When Amaya explained to Toby who her father really was, Amaya was able to enlist Toby (using the magic of Santa Muerte) to help exact an even worse revenge on Jack/Roberto.  Amaya tells Toby that her father will kill her mother (which in fact happened earlier when Jack was duped by the assassin he tortured into killing Katie to find Toby).  Amaya told Toby that Santa Muerte magic would give her the strength to carry out a terrible revenge on her father for that murder.  So Amaya purposefully let Jack and Toby escape.  Her plan was for them to live happily for many years and then for Toby to kill her father.  In the final scene, we see Jack and Toby fleeing deeper into Mexico on an old bus.  As she sits and watches the countryside go by, we hear Toby reciting the same Santa Muerta chant for power that others (including Jack) said throughout the movie.

Cast
The film stars Simon Baker, who was cast just before his great success with the hit TV show The Mentalist, and Paz Vega who was previously known for her work as the star of Sex and Lucia and the co-star of Spanglish and Michael DeLorenzo, who played a lead role as Detective Eddie Torres in the TV series New York Undercover.

Simon Baker as Jack Bishop. Baker was personally cast by the director Dror Soref for the lead role after the director had seen his previous work in film and in television. Soref met with Baker before starting pre-production to go over the script line by line, including all of the actions to get a better feel for the role.  
Paz Vega as Amaya Bishop
Chloë Grace Moretz as Toby Bishop
Claire Forlani as Katie
Michael DeLorenzo as Casper Navarro
Ken Davitian as Father Salinas
Julia Vera as Doña
Virginia Periera as Karen De La Rosa
Isaac Kappy as Stoner Dude

Development
The director began research on the film in 2004 by visiting, with co-writer Tomas Romero, the towns of Del Rio and Acuna, straddling the Texas-Mexican border. Soref had a prolific career as a music video and commercial director, working in the same company alongside such directors as Wim Wenders, Carroll Ballard, Jean-Pierre Jeunet and Bruce Beresford before beginning to transition into features.

Production
Principal photography took place over the course of 28 days in New Mexico with three days of shooting on location in the outskirts of Mexico City and two days of insert pickups in Los Angeles. Several key cast and crew members came from Austin, Texas including the art director Ed Vega.
In early 2009, Soref completed final post-production on Not Forgotten.

In 2016, it was revealed that the movie had been financed through an alleged Ponzi scheme run by Scientologists Michelle Seward and Dror Soref.

Distribution
As a result of the film's critical acclaim at the 2009 Slamdance Film Festival, Not Forgotten was picked up for US distribution. The film was notable for being the only entry picked up for US theatrical distribution from that year. In April 2009, Anchor Bay Films acquired the distribution rights to the movie. The film debuted in a regional premiere Austin, Texas  
and officially opened at Grauman's Chinese Theatre in Los Angeles on May 15, 2009.

Reception
The film has received generally negative reviews in the mainstream press. However, Variety stated the film "satisfies as a solidly crafted and persuasively acted thriller that relies more on dark secrets than black magic" while The Hollywood Reporter commented, "Not Forgotten reminds you of a paperback you pick up at the airport...where the cover promises a pulp-ish combination of suspense, murder and...the story is so engrossing, you wish the flight were longer".

References

External links
Official Site 
 
 
Metacritic
 

2000s thriller films
Films shot in New Mexico
Films set in Texas
Films set in Mexico
Films scored by Mark Isham
American thriller films
2000s English-language films
2000s American films